Mount Orford is a mountain and ski resort located in the Mont-Orford National Park in the Eastern Townships region of Quebec, Canada.

History
In 2006, the provincial government and then-Environment Minister Claude Béchard announced the increase of the size of Orford as a national park. In addition, they would have sold the ski resort and golf course to private interests. Inside the  that were to be sold, developers planned to build condominiums, restaurants, boutiques and a hotel. The planned development was to be similar to Mont-Tremblant but on a lesser scale, and several other projects had been planned previously. This was successfully opposed by several groups, including environmental. On May 7, 2007, new Environment Minister Line Beauchamp announced that the province would not sell Orford.

Recreation
The ski resort consists of three summits: Mont Giroux, Mont Orford, and Mont Alfred Desrochers. It is the home mountain of Olympic medalist Nicolas Fontaine, for whom there is a track named in his honour.

Other infrastructure on the mountain currently include:
Base lodge with bar, cafeteria, and rooftop terraces
Groomed cruising trails as well as moguls/glades
Ski shop, repair shop, and rental center

Former infrastructure :
Triple yurt summit lodge
Summit snack bar

See also
List of protected areas of Quebec
List of ski areas and resorts in Canada

References

External links
 Official website of the park

Mont Orford
Mountains of Quebec under 1000 metres
Ski areas and resorts in Quebec
Tourist attractions in Estrie